Cheap Seats without Ron Parker, or Cheap Seats: Without Ron Parker commonly shortened to Cheap Seats, is a television program broadcast on ESPN Classic and hosted by brothers Randy and Jason Sklar. The brothers appear as fictional ESPN tape librarians who amuse themselves by watching old, campy sports broadcasts and lampooning them. Produced by Mark Shapiro, Showrunner, Todd Pellegrino, James Cohen and Joseph Maar, Cheap Seats was originally an hour-long program. There were eight one hour-long episodes in the first season, all of which were edited to fit a 30-minute time slot.

A number of actors and comedians were featured in various in-studio comedy skits on the show, including Jim Gaffigan, H. Jon Benjamin, Paul Rudd, David Cross, Zach Galifianakis, Ed Helms, Eugene Mirman, Michael Ian Black, Nick Kroll, Kristen Schaal, Judah Friedlander, Nick Swardson, Mike Birbiglia, Doug Benson, Kathy Griffin, Carlos Alazraqui and Patton Oswalt.

Regular segments
Cheap Seats debuted on February 4, 2004, with the opening of the episode showing "Ron Parker" (played by Michael Showalter), the show's browbeating original host, injured by a shelf full of tapes after it collapses on him, thus forcing the Sklars to fill in as hosts. This skit was part of the show's opening theme until the second season, which featured a new introduction while all references to Parker were removed (although in the theme song which opened episodes of Season 4, the lyrics include "going farther than Ron Parker").

In addition to the Sklars' regular commentary, Cheap Seats contained regular segments such as "Do You Care?" (in which the Sklars informed viewers of obscure facts related to the shows they were watching), and "The Cheapies", where awards in nonsensical categories were given out to in-episode personalities at the show's closing. Other regular segments included "Breakdown", where then-ESPN analyst Sean Salisbury would comedically break down an athlete's performance; and "What Got Cut", in which other humorous elements of an episode that were edited due to time constraints were glossed over by the Sklars. "Cheap Shot of the Week" showcased an athlete featured earlier in the show or in a prior episode at their worst. Original sketches parodying a topic relevant to a particular program were filmed by various comedians.

The set featured a wall-mounted poster that would appear on camera prior to commercial breaks, which read "Attention ESPN Staff: Do Not Lend Tapes to This Person" and contained a photograph of a then-relevant notorious celebrity or athlete, such as Vince McMahon or Barry Bonds. A photo of the Sklars themselves was seen in the series finale.

Live-audience era
Cheap Seats briefly included a live studio audience and virtual laugh track during the second season, starting with an episode on the 1980 Major League Baseball All-Star Game. Only six shows were produced with this format, and the audience was gone by the premiere of the third season on September 19, 2005. The episodes with the audience were edited to minimize their presence in future reruns.

On the Road
Two episodes were taped in locations other than New York or Los Angeles. In October 2005, ESPN Classic aired "Cheap Seats on the Road" from the Sklar brothers' hometown of St. Louis, Missouri, where the second Busch Stadium was being torn down because part of it was on the same land on which Busch Stadium III was being constructed. On the episode, the Sklars try to convince city officials to cancel the stadium's demolition by combining the two into a bizarre superstructure.

During Season 3, Cheap Seats went to Hillsborough, New Jersey, after a contestant won a contest for the Sklars to film an episode in their home. The episode was titled Cheap Seats on the Road: A Fan's Couch.

Utilityman: The Quest for Cooperstown
This particular episode, which is not officially a part of the Cheap Seats canon, is a 2004 ESPN special (produced by MLB Productions). It features the Sklars going on a trip to St. Louis and then to Cooperstown. The Sklars went all the way to the National Baseball Hall of Fame on a campaign to get beloved 1980s and 1990s St. Louis Cardinals player José "The Utilityman" Oquendo inducted for his versatility to play almost any position on the baseball field. (In 1988, Oquendo became the first National League player since 1918 to have played all nine positions in one season.) The special includes the Sklars receiving Oquendo's blessing to lobby for his spot in Cooperstown, collecting signatures for the petition and giving a lackluster presentation to the HOF's committee. After initially denying their claim, the committee agreed to place his plaque in a spot that best fit Oquendo and his skills: the utility closet. It remains there to this day.

Source material
Most of the broadcasts are from ESPN's archives. Among them:
 Wide World of Sports broadcasts
 Professional wrestling
 Scripps National Spelling Bee
 World Series of Poker final tables
 Steve Garvey celebrity sporting events

Cheap Seats was shot in New York City (with segments filmed in Los Angeles) and had made use of local comedians as guest stars in its sketches. Most of the bit parts were played by stand-up comics whom Jason and Randy met during their years on the road as standup comedians themselves. The show was influenced chiefly by Mystery Science Theater 3000 and MTV's Beavis and Butt-head, as the hosts' comment on the material in the style of a peanut gallery.  The "Creative Breaking/K-1 Fighting" episode guest-starred the cast of Mystery Science Theater 3000, in their theatrical silhouette form, cracking on sketches the Sklars performed.

ESPN Classic broadcast an all-day marathon of Cheap Seats episodes on Thanksgiving Day in 2004, an homage to the similar marathons of MST3K that were frequently run on Comedy Central during Thanksgiving in the first half of the 1990s.

After the first season, a SportsCentury mockumentary was filmed about how its first season made a large impact on the world. Archived interviews from past SportsCentury episodes were edited into the program as if the interview subjects were speaking about the show itself.

Series finale
A special titled This is Inside Cheap Seats that aired on April 17, 2006, though most of the content therein was fictional. The fourth and final season premiered on June 5, 2006.

In the "Fall Preview" article in the September 25, 2006 issue of ESPN The Magazine, the Sklars announced that "after 77 episodes, we're bringing Cheap Seats to a close by cleaning out our video closet in a very special series finale." It aired on November 19, and included racquetball, amateur bowling, curling, model airplane racing, and ping-pong. The episode's main focus was on the Sklars (fictitiously) getting a job as anchors on ESPN's SportsCenter. However, it turned out they weren't hired to be anchors, but as errand boys to do the anchors' bidding, causing the brothers to consider going back to the show, which was currently being hosted by then New York Yankees outfielder Johnny Damon (a fan of the show) and a recurring character called the "Score Settler." Before the last episode, ESPN Classic presented 12 previous episodes in a six-hour "finale-a-thon."

Cheap Seats reruns do not currently air on the now-defunct ESPN Classic or any other network. Selected episodes from the first season were at one time, but are no longer, available for purchase through the iTunes Store.

References

External links

 

American non-fiction television series
2004 American television series debuts
2000s American sketch comedy television series
ESPN Classic original programming
American sports television series
2006 American television series endings
English-language television shows